The Ivory Coast Women's Championship is the top flight of women's association football in Ivory Coast. The competition is run by the Ivorian Football Federation.

History
The first Ivorian women's championship was contested in the 1985–86 season.

Champions
The list of champions and runners-up:

Most successful clubs

See also
 Ivory Coast Women's Cup
 Ivory Coast Women's Federation Cup

References

External links 
 FIF official website

 
Women's association football leagues in Africa
Football competitions in Ivory Coast
Women
1985 establishments in Ivory Coast
Sports leagues established in 1985